Mati Kodheli (1862–1881) was an Albanian photographer who served as an apprentice to master photographer Pietro Marubi. He was the older brother of Kel Kodheli.

Life
Mati Kodheli was born in Shkodër to a lower-middle-class family. His father Rrok Kodheli, worked as a gardener at the estate of Italian photographer Pietro Marubi from Piacenza, who had recently settled in Albania after being forced to leave his native country for being accused of involvement in the murder of the local town mayor.

Mati was sent to study photography at the Sebastianutti & Benque studio in Trieste, Italy. He died prematurely at the young age of nineteen, from tuberculosis.

Only two negatives of his work collection have survived, a 1878 photograph of the Shkodër Musical Band, whom he was a member of, and a photograph of his childhood friend Kolë Idromeno.

References

Albanian photographers
People from Shkodër
1862 births
1881 deaths